ESDEN Business School is an international business school located in Spain. Founded in 1996, it works in collaboration with the Madrid chapter of the Project Management Institute and the London School of Economics.

ESDEN holds an Association of Spanish Business Schools (AEEN), a Latin American Council of Business Schools (CLADEA) and a Qfor quality accreditations.

Campuses 
Esden Business School has campuses in Madrid, Bilbao and Barcelona. In Madrid, the campus has two locations in the financial district and it offers 15 programmes. In Bilbao, the campus is located in the Colegio de los Padres Escolapios. International campuses are located in Bogota, Mexico City and Lima.

Programmes 

Esden Business School offers various MBA degree options and other master courses. Degree options are in combination of specializations, intakes and delivery formats. Admissions criteria for MBA candidates include holding a university degree, a relevant work experience and a required interview with programme directors. In addition,  the school runs management and development courses.

Main Masters Programs 
 Global MBA
 MBA in General Management (60 ECTs) Formats - online, blended, and classroom-based
 MBA in Professional Degree
 MBA in Fashion Business Management
 Master in Project Management (PMP)
 Master in Digital Marketing and Internet Corporate Communication Management (Web 2.0)
 Master in Marketing and Commercial Management
 Master in International Trade Management
 Master in Protocol and Organisation of Events
 Master in Renewable Energy 
 Master in Hospitality Business Management
 Master in Human Resources Management and Labour Relations
 Master in Quality & Safety Management
 Executive MBA

See also
 List of business schools in Europe
 Business School
 Master of Business Administration

References

External links
  (MBA Pursuit)
  (ESDEN ranked 3rd most sought EMBA in Spain - 2012)
  (Spanish Business School Ranking)
  (Esden on Twitter)

Business schools in Spain
Educational institutions established in 1996
1996 establishments in Spain